The New Toho Food Center is a historic Chinese food restaurant in Manila, Philippines established in the 19th century.

Other outlets of the restaurant in southern Metro Manila operates as Toho Antigua.

Nomenclature
The name "Toho" has no specific naming according to owner Alvin Wong in 2019. Prior publications have claimed that the word came from the Hokkien term for "just right". However "just right" is in fact tuho not toho.

"Antigua" came from founder, Bautista's affinity for things that have proved their value over time.

History
Established sometime in the 19th century, there is a lack of verifiable information regarding the restaurant's early history. The restaurant, through its signage, markets itself as having established in 1888 but according to  The Governor-General's Kitchen: Philippine Culinary Vignettes and Period Recipes, 1521–1935 of food historian Felice Santa Maria, the restaurant was established as Antigua by Manuel “Po Kong” Bautista in 1866.

Filipino novelist and national hero, José Rizal and Philippine presidents were noted to have dined in the restaurant.

The current owners, has managed the restaurant for at least three generations having acquired the restaurant, then known as the Toho Antigua Panciteria from a group Chinese immigrants who decided to return to China.

Other locations
In January 2000, the restaurant opened its second outlet under the name, Toho Restaurant Antigua in BF Homes, Parañaque after owner Alvin Wong noticed that a significant portion of the main Binondo restaurant consist s of people in southern Metro Manila. In 2013, a third restaurant was opened in SM BF Homes. Toho except for the main branch was rebranded as Toho Antigua. As of 2019, there are four Toho Antigua outlets in southern Metro Manila.

Reference

1866 establishments in the Philippines
Restaurants in the Philippines
Binondo
Restaurants established in 1866